Naruto is a Japanese manga which consists of an anime adaptation and video games. 

Naruto or Narutō may also refer to:

Naruto Uzumaki, the protagonist of the franchise

Places
 Narutō, Chiba, a former town in Chiba Prefecture, Japan
 Naruto, Tokushima, a city in Tokushima Prefecture, Japan
 Naruto Strait, between Awaji Island and Naruto city, Shikoku, Japan
 Naruto whirlpools, tidal whirlpools in the Naruto Strait
 Naruto University of Education, a national university located in Naruto, Tokushima
 Naruto Athletic Stadium, a multi-purpose stadium in Naruto, Tokushima

Sumo
 Naruto (toshiyori), sumo elder
 Naruto stable, a stable of sumo wrestlers

Transportation
 Naruto Line, a railway line in Tokushima Prefecture, Japan
 Naruto Station, a train station in Naruto, Tokushima Prefecture, Japan
 Narutō Station, a train station in Sanmu, Chiba Prefecture, Japan
 Ōnaruto Bridge, connecting Awaji Island and Naruto city in Shikoku

Other uses
 94356 Naruto, a main-belt asteroid
 Narutomaki, a kind of kamaboko, or cured fish product
 Naruto, a macaque in the monkey selfie copyright dispute
 Naruto, a character in Cosmic Carnage